Bale is a small railway station in the Bale area of Solapur, Maharashta, India.

Only the Solapur – Pune passenger train stops here.

References

External links
 

Railway stations in Solapur district